Jack Emery is the name of

 Jack Emery (director) (born 1945), British director, writer and producer
 Jack Emery (athlete) (1913–2013), British runner who won the 1938 International Cross Country Championships